Noring Terrace is a relatively level ice-covered terrace rising to  with an area of about 4 square miles between Mount Gunn and Mount Basurto in the southwest Convoy Range of Victoria Land. Ice from the terrace drains westward into Cambridge Glacier and also eastward in the short Scudding Glacier toward Battleship Promontory. It was named by the Advisory Committee on Antarctic Names in 2007 after Randy (Crunch) Noring who served 25 summer seasons and 3 winters in Antarctica between 1991 and 2019 at the South Pole and McMurdo Stations, working in operations, heavy equipment and fuels, and  since 1999 as the Camp Manager at Marble Point in Victoria Land.

References

Landforms of Victoria Land